Suzana Ferreira Alves or Tiazinha ("Auntie") (born São Paulo, August 3, 1978) is a major Brazilian sex symbol.  The issue of the Brazilian Playboy that featured Tiazinha is one of the best-selling ones of all times for the Brazilian edition of the magazine.

She started as a dancer in the TV-show H at Rede Bandeirantes. The "Auntie" character was a dominatrix woman dressed in lingerie that would dance and be part of a game where Suzana would wax male participants in a live stage show. The participants would answer general knowledge  questions, if the answer was incorrect they would be punished with waxing; if correct they would be rewarded with money prizes and lap dances from "Auntie".

She also released an album and starred her own action adventure TV-series, As Aventuras de Tiazinha (The Adventures of Tiazinha).

Ever since her departure from H in 2000, Alves has invested in her acting career, mostly on stage. She appeared in four episodes of Amigas & Rivais during 2007.

Alves is married since 2010 to retired tennis player Flávio Saretta, with whom she has a son.

Filmography

References

External links 
 
 

1978 births
Living people
People from São Paulo
Brazilian actresses